Sir Percy Florence Shelley, 3rd Baronet (12 November 1819 – 5 December 1889) was the son of the English poet Percy Bysshe Shelley and his second wife, Mary Wollstonecraft Shelley, novelist and author of Frankenstein. He was the only child of Mary Wollstonecraft Shelley to live beyond infancy. His middle name, possibly suggested by his father's friend Sophia Stacey, came from the city of his birth, Florence in Italy. He had two elder half-siblings, by his father's first marriage to Harriet Westbrook, and three full siblings who died in infancy.

Early life and education
Percy Florence was born as the fourth child of the poet Percy Bysshe Shelley, his namesake, and his wife, author Mary Shelley. His elder siblings, consisting of a premature girl who died at a few weeks old and a brother and a sister who died in childhood, left him as the only surviving child after his mother suffered a miscarriage in 1822. 

His parents lived in Italy for several years, until his father drowned near Livorno (then known to the English as Leghorn), whereupon his mother moved back to England with him. Mary Shelley never remarried; Percy Florence had no further siblings. He joined Harrow School in 1832, and went up to Trinity College, Cambridge in October 1837.

Adult life
Shelley inherited the baronetcy upon the death of his grandfather in 1844, becoming the 3rd Baronet of Castle Goring, Sussex. In 1845, giving his address as Putney (then a riverside village just upstream of London), he was elected to the Royal Thames Yacht Club.

On 22 June 1848, he married Jane Gibson, one of nine illegitimate children of Thomas Gibson, a wealthy Newcastle banker, by Ann Shevill; Jane was the widow of the Hon. Charles Robert St. John, son of the 3rd Viscount Bolingbroke and the Viscountess Bolingbroke, Baroness Hompesch. The couple had no children, although they adopted Jane's niece, Bessie Florence Gibson, the youngest child of Jane's brother Edward Gibson. Bessie Gibson married Lieutenant-Colonel Leopold James Yorke Campbell Scarlett (grandson of the 1st Baron Abinger, a politician and judge), and was the mother of Shelley, Robert and Hugh Scarlett, the 5th, 6th and 7th Barons Abinger respectively.

He was appointed High Sheriff of Sussex in 1865. He appeared in the 'Men of the Day' series in Vanity Fair in 1879 as "The Poet's Son", a caricature by Ape. The caption reads: "But he delights above all in yachting and in private theatricals, and is even now engaged in building a theatre for amateur performers. He is a gentleman." His London house he fitted with a private theatre; this was in Tite Street, Chelsea, a favoured and fashionable location for people of an artistic and literary disposition, according to The London Encyclopedia.  While it was occupied by him and used for private performances, it caused no trouble. During a later period, however, it was rented to a tenant that used the facility for charity fund-raising performances where tickets were publicly sold, thus contravening the local bylaws. According to Yachting World, Shelley was a member of the prestigious and exclusive Royal Yacht Squadron at Cowes on the Isle of Wight.

Death
Shelley died in 1889 and was buried in the family vault in the churchyard of St Peter's Church, Bournemouth, reputedly with the heart of his father alongside him. In that vault, in addition to the patrilineal family, lie the remains of his maternal grandparents, namely Mary Wollstonecraft and William Godwin; Shelley and his wife were instrumental in moving their bones from St Pancras Old Church in London. The Shelley baronetcy passed to his first cousin, Edward Shelley (1827–1890), of Avington House, Hampshire, a Captain in the 16th Lancers, son of John Shelley (1806–1866), of Avington House, JP, DL, High Sheriff of Hampshire in 1853, the younger brother of Percy Bysshe Shelley.

Legacy
A blue plaque was installed, by Bournemouth Borough Council, on 30 June 1985, in honour of Shelley, at the entrance to his former home "Boscombe Manor", now the "Shelley Manor Medical Centre".

References

1819 births
1889 deaths
People educated at Harrow School
Alumni of Trinity College, Cambridge
Godwin family
High Sheriffs of Sussex
Baronets in the Baronetage of the United Kingdom
Shelley baronets, of Castle Goring